Gabrielle Anna Charlotte Robinne (1 July 1886 – 18 December 1980) was a French stage and film actress whose career spanned over sixty years.

Career
Born in Montluçon, Allier, France, Robinne was a pupil of Maurice de Féraudy at the Paris Conservatory. In 1904 she entered the company of Sarah Bernhardt and for a year she joined the Theatre Michel in St. Petersburg, Russia. Her career blossomed while performing at the Comédie-Française in 1907 and she became a sociétaire in 1924 and remained there until 1938. She made her film debut in the 1906 Segundo de Chomón-directed short Le troubadour. She is often regarded by critics to be the first French star of the silent film era.

Gabrielle Robinne alternated her time between the stage and film. Between 1906 and 1973, Robinne would appear in nearly fifty films. Her last film appearance was a role in the 1973 Stanislav Stanojevic-directed drama Le journal d'un suicidé (English release title: Diary of a Suicide).

Personal life and death
Gabrielle Robinne was married to actor René Alexandre from 1912 until his death in 1946. She never remarried. She died in Saint-Cloud, Hauts-de-Seine, France in 1980 at the age of 94.

Legacy
In 2006, after several years of restoration, the local theatre in Robinne's home village of Montluçon was renamed the Théâtre Municipal Gabrielle Robinne and was opened to the public by actress Audrey Tautou. Renovated at a cost of €2.5 million, the theatre was named in Robinne's honor and was mainly financed by the State, the General Council and the Regional Council. The theatre was founded in 1912 and opened 17 January 1914, with Robinne present on the day of the first opening.

For her work in the French arts, Gabrielle Robinne was made an Officer of the Legion of Honor.

Selected filmography

References

External links

1886 births
1980 deaths
French stage actresses
French film actresses
French silent film actresses
People from Montluçon
Officiers of the Légion d'honneur
Sociétaires of the Comédie-Française
20th-century French actresses
Conservatoire de Paris alumni